Franca Tamantini (24 August 1931 – 11 August 2014) was an Italian film, television and stage actress.

Life and career
Born in Rome, since young age Tamantini studied piano, singing and classical dance at the Teatro dell'Opera di Roma. In 1948 she was chosen by Luchino Visconti to play Olimpia in the stage drama Rosalinda o come vi piace, and one year later she made her film debut in Fernando Cerchio's Cenerentola, a musical adaptation of the Charles Perrault's fairy tale Cinderella.

During her career Tamantini was often cast in operettas and musical comedies, both in the theater and in television. In films, she was often cast in character roles, and she enjoyed a late success only at mature age, with the role of Miss Necchi in the Amici Miei film series.

Filmography

References

External links

 

1931 births
2014 deaths
Actresses from Rome
Italian film actresses
20th-century Italian actresses
Italian stage actresses
Italian television actresses